KYYW (1470 AM) is a news/talk radio station that serves the Abilene, Texas, area. The station is under ownership of Townsquare Media.

History
The station went on air in 1938 on a local channel. Its former callsign KRBC was made up of the first letters of Reporter Broadcasting Company (RBC). RBC was an affiliate of the Abilene Reporter-News newspaper. In late 1940s, the station changed frequencies to 1470 with 5,000 watts days and 1,000 watts at night using a three tower directional antenna located north of Abilene. Studios were in a downtown hotel for many years. KRBC radio later moved in with KRBC-TV (channel 9) on south 14th street.

KRBC was spun off to some of its shareholders (members of the Fox family) in 1986. They later acquired an FM in nearby Merkel, Texas, which is today's KHXS (102.7). Scion Shane Fox went on to found Maxagrid, a maker of ratings analysis software. He later owned many central Texas stations.

KYYW changed formats from classic country to news/talk on Monday, March 1, 2010. The classic country format moved to sister station KSLI.

On Thursday, November 26, 2020 at 12:30 a.m., translator K234DA signed on the air at 94.7 megahertz and began simulcasting 1470 AM.

References

External links
News/Talk 1470 official website

YYW
News and talk radio stations in the United States
Radio stations established in 1975
Townsquare Media radio stations